John Babington may refer to:
Sir John Babington (died 1485), knight killed at the Battle of Bosworth
John Babington (mathematician) (fl. 1635), English mathematician and gunner
Sir John Tremayne Babington (1891–1979), British Royal Air Force officer
John Babington (Royal Navy officer) (1911–1992), British Royal Navy officer awarded the George Cross in World War II